Hednota xiphosema is a moth in the family Crambidae. It was described by Turner in 1904. It is found in Australia, where it has been recorded from Victoria.

References

Crambinae
Moths described in 1904